The Longmen Jianshan Pier is a pier in Huxi Township, Penghu County, Taiwan.

Architecture
The pier spans over an area of 147.7 hectares, which consists of 131.8 hectares of water area and 15.9 hectares of land area. It has a width of 120 meters and water channel depth of 8 meters. It has eight berths.

Activities
The pier handles the logistics of general freight, raw materials and construction materials. The pier has a maximum annual cargo loading capacity of 1 million freight tons.

See also
 Transportation in Taiwan

References

Buildings and structures in Penghu County
Piers in Taiwan